Huamanchoque (possibly from Quechua waman falcon or variable hawk, chuqi metal, every kind of precious metal / gold (<Aymara)) is a  mountain in the Urubamba mountain range in the Andes of Peru. It is located in the Cusco Region, Calca Province, Calca District, north of the Vilcanota River. Huamanchoque lies at the Cancha Cancha valley where the Lares trek route passes by. It is situated south of Canchacanchajasa, southwest of Sahuasiray and Cóndorhuachana, and north of a lower peak named Cóndorhuachana. One of the nearest towns is Huayllabamba.

References

Mountains of Peru
Mountains of Cusco Region